Jerome Bertram Komisar (born 1937) is an American economist and academic administrator most notable for serving as President of the University of Alaska.

Biography
Komisar was born in Brooklyn, New York.  He received a bachelor's degree in economics from New York University in 1957, master's and Ph.D degrees in economics from Columbia University in 1959 and 1968, respectively.  His dissertation committee included two winners of the Nobel Prize in economics, Gary Becker and Jacob Mincer.  He began at the City College of New York in 1959 and moved to Hamilton College in 1961.  In 1966, he joined Binghamton University, where he held a number of faculty and administrative positions, most notably acting Chancellor in 1987 and 1988.

In 1990, he assumed the Presidency of the University of Alaska system, serving in that role for eight years.

Selected publications

References

1935 births
Economists from New York (state)
Binghamton University faculty
City University of New York faculty
Columbia Graduate School of Arts and Sciences alumni
Hamilton College (New York) faculty
Living people
New York University alumni
People from Brooklyn
Chancellors of the State University of New York
Presidents of the University of Alaska System